Draževnik is a small settlement southeast of Dobrova in the Municipality of Dobrova–Polhov Gradec in the Upper Carniola region of Slovenia.

Name
The name Draževnik, like similar toponyms (e.g., Draža vas, Draženci, Dražgoše), is probably derived from a Slavic personal name (such as *Dragъ/Drago, *Dražigojь, *Dražigostь) and likely refers to an early inhabitant of the place. In the past it was known as Draschounik in German.

History
On 18 November 1942 Italian forces killed several villagers from Draževnik in nearby Podsmreka.

References

External links

Draževnik on Geopedia

Populated places in the Municipality of Dobrova-Polhov Gradec